3,3-Bis(azidomethyl)oxetane (BAMO) is a oxetane monomer used in energetic propellant binders and plasticizer. It is frequently used as a copolymer to improve the physical properties of more commonly used polymers and to give them energetic properties.

Preparation 
BAMO is made by reacting BCMO with sodium azide in an alkaline solution. Tetrabutyl ammonium bromide is used as a phase-transfer catalyst in the reaction.

PolyBAMO can be made by mixing boron trifluoride diethyl etherate and BAMO in trimethylolpropane. The polymerization of BAMO destroys the oxetane ring, but the azide groups remain intact.

References 

Oxetanes
Monomers
Plasticizers
Organoazides